The year 1582 in science and technology included a number of events, some of which are listed here. This year sees the introduction of the Gregorian calendar, promulgated by Pope Gregory XIII in the Papal bull Inter gravissimas on February 24 and based largely on the work of Christopher Clavius. Under the Habsburg monarchy in Spain, Portugal and Italy, together with the Polish–Lithuanian Commonwealth, the year continues under the Julian calendar as normal until Thursday October 4, the next day becoming Friday October 15; France follows two months later, letting Sunday December 9 be followed by Monday December 20. Other countries switch in later years.

Astronomy
 Giovanni Antonio Magini publishes the ephemerides Ephemerides coelestium motuum.

Exploration
 Richard Hakluyt publishes Divers Voyages Touching the Discoverie of America and the Ilands Adjacent unto the Same, Made First of all by our Englishmen.

Medicine
 Urbain Hémard investigates the anatomy of the teeth with Recherche de la vraye anathomie des dents, nature et propriété d’icelles.
 Ambroise Paré publishes Discours d'Ambroise Paré : avec une table des plus notables matières contenues esdits discours ; De la mumie ; De la licorne ; Des venins.

Psychology
 Giordano Bruno publishes De umbris idearum (The Shadow of Ideas), Ars Memoriae (The Art of Memory), and Cantus Circaeus (Circe's Song) in Paris.

Births
 John Bainbridge, English astronomer (died 1648)
 Giovanni Battista Baliani, Genoese physicist (died 1666)

Deaths
 Jacques Peletier du Mans, French mathematician (born 1517)

References

 
16th century in science
1580s in science